Güzelyurt District is a district of Aksaray Province of Turkey. Its seat is the town Güzelyurt. Its area is 285 km2, and its population is 10,677 (2021).

Composition
There are three municipalities in Güzelyurt District:
 Güzelyurt
 Ihlara
 Selime

There are 8 villages in Güzelyurt District:

 Alanyurt
 Belisırma
 Bozcayurt
 Gaziemir
 Ilısu
 Sivrihisar
 Uzunkaya
 Yaprakhisar

References

Districts of Aksaray Province